A bean bag round, also known by its trademarked name flexible baton round, is a type of baton round, fired from a shotgun, and used for less lethal apprehension of suspects.

Description
It is fired from a normal 12-gauge shotgun. It is designed to deliver a blow that will cause minimum long-term trauma and no penetration but will result in a muscle spasm or other reaction to briefly render a violent suspect immobile. It still can cause serious injury and death. Changes to the bean bag round since its inception in the early 1970s have included a velocity reduction from 120 to 90 meters per second (400 to 300 ft/s) as well as a shift from a square shape to a more rounded sock-shaped projectile.

Shotguns dedicated to being used for bean bag rounds are often visibly modified with either yellow or green markings, or bright orange stocks and stops, to reduce the possibility that a user might inadvertently load lethal munitions into the weapon.

Use

Bean bag rounds are used when a person is a danger to themselves or others but is not a direct threat in such a manner that deadly force would be appropriate – typically a suicidal individual with a bladed weapon.  The round is intended to disable the person without killing them.

Dangers
A bean bag round can severely injure or kill in a wide variety of ways. They have caused around one death a year since their introduction in the US. A round can hit the chest, break the ribs and send the broken ribs into the heart.  A shot to the head can break the nose, crush the larynx or break the neck or skull of the subject.  This is why many officers are taught to aim for the extremities when using a bean bag round.  A strike in the abdominal area can cause internal bleeding or strike the celiac plexus which can disrupt breathing or heartbeat, but such a hit is generally safer than most other areas as well as presenting a larger target than an extremity.  Fatalities are occasionally the result of mistaking other shotgun rounds for bean bags.

In 2006, during anti-corruption protests in Budapest, Hungary, protestors were shot by beanbag rounds to the head. At least 3 of them were permanently blinded. One of the victims committed suicide in 2013 due to psychological complications arising from his blindness. In addition, many people suffered minor injuries (nose and finger fractures, hemorrhagic bruises). Furthermore, a few victims suffered from long-term psychological trauma due to the shock.
In 2013, in Park Forest, Illinois, an autopsy showed that a 95-year-old man had died from hemoperitoneum as a result of being shot by police with a bean bag gun.
11 August 2019, during the Hong Kong anti-extradition bill protests, a female First Aider was suspected to have been hit with a bean bag round, resulting in rupture of one of her eyeballs.
 On 23 November 2019, a bean bag round fired by the Colombian riot police hit student Dilan Cruz in the head, killing him.
 31 May 2020, 20-year-old Justin Howell was shot in the head by the Austin PD, suffering a skull fracture leading to seizure and brain trauma.  The next day, 1 June 2020, 16-year-old Brad Levi Ayala also suffered a skull fracture after being shot in the head with a beanbag round by the Austin PD.
 22 August 2022, Chris Amyotte, 42, an Ojibwa man from Manitoba, died after being hit by a beanbag round fired at him by an officer of the Vancouver Police Department in Vancouver, British Columbia, Canada.

See also
Non-lethal weapon
Wooden bullet
Shooting of Victoria Snelgrove

References

Further reading

Non-lethal projectiles
Projectiles
Shotgun shells
Police weapons
Paramilitary cartridges
Riot control weapons